Jarosław Lindner (born Jarosław Ciarczyński on 28 June 1988) is a Polish professional footballer who plays as a striker for Sportfreunde Lotte.

Career
Born in Gdańsk, Lindner played with Polish side Janowianka Janow in his youth before moving to the Hannover 96 youth teams in August 2003. Lindner made his professional debut in the Bundesliga as a substitute in the 1–0 loss to 1899 Hoffenheim on 29 August 2009.

From 2010 to 2015, Lindner played for German third division side Holstein Kiel. On 11 August 2015, Lindner transferred to SV Wehen Wiesbaden on a two-year contract. On 21 August 2016, he transferred again to Sportfreunde Lotte, signing on a one year deal.

References

External links
 
 
 

Living people
1988 births
People from Gdańsk County
Sportspeople from Pomeranian Voivodeship
Polish footballers
Association football forwards
Bundesliga players
3. Liga players
Regionalliga players
Hannover 96 players
Hannover 96 II players
Holstein Kiel players
SV Wehen Wiesbaden players
Sportfreunde Lotte players
BSV Schwarz-Weiß Rehden players